Feilden may refer to:

People 
Bernard Feilden (1919–2008), British conservation architect
Bob Feilden (1917–2004), British mechanical engineer
Gerry Feilden  (1904–1981), British general and horse racing identity
Henry Feilden (disambiguation)
Joseph Feilden (1824–1895), British politician
Richard Feilden (1950–2005), British architect
William Feilden (1772–1850), British politician

Horse racing 
 Feilden Stakes
 Gerry Feilden Hurdle

Other uses 
 Feilden baronets

See also 
 Fielden